Ismail Molla (1938 – 2 September 2020) was a Greek politician who served as an MP.

References

1938 births
2020 deaths
Greek politicians
People from Komotini